Arta Luīze Lubiņa (born 29 May 2004) is a Latvian footballer who plays as a defender for Metta and the Latvia national team.

International career
Lubiņa made her debut for the Latvia national team on 10 June 2021, coming on as a substitute for Liāna Rožaščonoka against Lithuania.

References

2004 births
Living people
Women's association football defenders
Latvian women's footballers
Latvia women's international footballers